This is a list of Portuguese television related events from 2015.

Events
January 1 – Elisabete Moutinho wins series 5 of Secret Story, becoming the show's first female winner of the regular format.
February 22 – Sofia Sousa, the runner up of series 4 of Secret Story wins series 3 of Secret Story: Desafio Final.
March 15 – Bruno Sousa, 3rd finalist of series 5 of Secret Story wins series 1 of Secret Story: Luta Pelo Poder.
April 5 – Liliana Garcia wins series 2 of Achas que Sabes Dançar?.
April 12 – Acrobatic gymnastics troupe The Artgym Company wins the first series of Got Talent Portugal.
May 20 – Animal welfare groups announce that a campaign to halt Dolphins with the Stars, a show involving celebrities performing with dolphins, has been suspended.
June 7 – Morangos com Açúcar actress Sara Prata and her partner Marco Moreira win series 3 of Dança com as Estrelas.
August 23 – João Couto wins series 6 of Ídolos.
November 18 – FX Portugal is being renamed Fox Comedy Portugal.
December 1 – TVI's cable channel +TVI is closing after three years of being on air.
December 31 – Kelly Medeiros wins series 3 of A Quinta.

Television shows

Programs debuting in 2015

Programs ending in 2015

Television films and specials

Programs returning in 2015

International programs/seasons premiering in 2015

Births

Deaths
January 6 - Filipa Vacondeus, famous chef
January 15 - António Rocha, famous TV actor and movie producer
January 25 - Mário Jacques, famous TV actor
February 24 - Maria Zamora, famous TV actress
April 2 - Manoel de Oliveira, famous film director and screenwriter
June 9 - Nuno Melo, famous TV actor
July 5 - Maria Barroso, actress, politician and first lady
September 8 - Delfina Cruz, famous TV actress

References